Çayırköy can refer to the following villages in Turkey:

 Çayırköy, Bolu
 Çayırköy, Maden
 Çayırköy, Merzifon
 Çayırköy, Osmancık
 Çayırköy, Sındırgı

See also
 Çayırköy Cave